Muskwe is a Zimbabwean surname. Notable people with this surname include:

Adelaide Muskwe (born 1998), Zimbabwean netball player
Admiral Muskwe (born 1998), Zimbabwean football forward 

Surnames of African origin